Dmitry Lapkes (born 4 June 1976) is a Belarusian sabre fencer, who has competed at four Olympic games. His best result in the Olympic games is finishing 4th in Athens. He won a silver medal in the team sabre event at the 2011 World Fencing Championships.

References

External links
 

1976 births
Living people
Belarusian male sabre fencers
Olympic fencers of Belarus
Fencers at the 2000 Summer Olympics
Fencers at the 2004 Summer Olympics
Fencers at the 2008 Summer Olympics
Fencers at the 2012 Summer Olympics
Sportspeople from Minsk
Universiade medalists in fencing
Universiade bronze medalists for Belarus
Medalists at the 1997 Summer Universiade
21st-century Belarusian people